Afato So'oalo (born January 5, 1974 in Apia) is a former Samoan rugby union player. He played for the Manu Samoa team and also played for the Crusaders and for Aviron Bayonnais in France. He played as a winger.

Career
A devastating runner, So'oalo debuted for Samoa during a match against Ireland, at Lansdowne Road, on November 12, 1996, where he scored one of the most memorable tries in recent history when completing a 70-yard move with his first touch. He was part of the 1999 Rugby World Cup roster, playing two matches, where he scored a try against Japan. His last international cap was also against Ireland, at Lansdowne Road, on November 11, 2001.

He was a regular member of the Crusaders from 1997-2001 and played on the right wing. So’oalo excelled in the No.14 jersey, and in a memorable moment in the 1999 Super Rugby final scored a match winning try against the Highlanders, by out sprinting Jeff Wilson to score in the corner, and win the game for the Crusaders.

References

External links

Afato So'oalo at New Zealand Rugby History

1974 births
Living people
Sportspeople from Apia
Samoan rugby union players
Samoan expatriates in New Zealand
Rugby union wings
Samoa international rugby union players
Crusaders (rugby union) players